Namyang Gal clan was one of the Korean clans. Their Bon-gwan was in Hwaseong, Gyeonggi, Gyeonggi Province. According to the research in 2015, the number of Namyang Gal clan was 453. They were separated from Zhuge clan. Zhuge clan’s founder was Zhuge Gui, father of Zhuge Liang. Jegal Gongsun, 20th descendant of Zhuge Gui, was naturalized in Silla during Heungdeok of Silla’s reign. Jegal Hyeong became the founder of the Namyang Gal clan.

See also 
 Korean clan names of foreign origin

References

External links 
 

Korean clan names of Chinese origin